is a railway station located in Adachi, Tokyo, Japan.

Lines 

Tokyo Metropolitan Bureau of Transportation
Nippori-Toneri Liner

Station Layout
This elevated station consists of a single island platform serving two tracks.

History 
The station opened on 30 March 2008, when the Nippori-Toneri Liner began operation.

Station numbering was introduced in November 2017 with the station receiving station number NT07.

References

External links

Kōya Station (Toei) 

Railway stations in Tokyo
Railway stations in Japan opened in 2008
Nippori-Toneri Liner